Vojin Lazarević (Cyrillic: Војин Лазаревић; born 22 February 1942) is a Yugoslav former football manager and player.

Club career
A prolific striker, Lazarević started out at his hometown club Sutjeska Nikšić. He was the Yugoslav Second League (Group East) top scorer on three occasions, before moving to Red Star Belgrade in 1966. Over the next four seasons, Lazarević scored 70 goals in 112 appearances in the Yugoslav First League, helping the club win three consecutive championships (1968, 1969, and 1970). He subsequently moved abroad and played for RFC Liège (Belgium) and Nancy (France), before returning to Red Star Belgrade in 1972. In the 1972–73 season, Lazarević was the league's joint top scorer with 25 goals, as the club won the title. He moved abroad again in 1974, this time to Canada, and joined the Toronto Metros. Shortly after, Lazarević returned to his homeland and played one season with Vrbas, before retiring from the game.

International career
Lazarević represented Yugoslavia internationally, earning five caps and scoring one goal between 1964 and 1969.

Managerial career
Lazarević served twice as manager of Red Star Belgrade in the late 1990s, winning two national cups. He was also manager of Milicionar (2000) and Sutjeska Nikšić (2001).

Honours

Player
Sutjeska Nikšić
 Yugoslav Second League: 1963–64, 1965–66
Red Star Belgrade
 Yugoslav First League: 1967–68, 1968–69, 1969–70, 1972–73
 Yugoslav Cup: 1967–68, 1969–70

Manager
Red Star Belgrade
 FR Yugoslavia Cup: 1996–97, 1998–99

Individual
 Yugoslav First League Top Scorer: 1968–69, 1972–73

References

External links
 NASL profile
 
 
 

1942 births
Living people
Footballers from Nikšić
Association football forwards
Montenegrin footballers
Yugoslav footballers
Yugoslavia international footballers
FK Sutjeska Nikšić players
Red Star Belgrade footballers
RFC Liège players
AS Nancy Lorraine players
Toronto Blizzard (1971–1984) players
FK Vrbas players
Yugoslav First League players
Belgian Pro League players
Ligue 1 players
North American Soccer League (1968–1984) players
Yugoslav expatriate footballers
Expatriate footballers in Belgium
Yugoslav expatriate sportspeople in Belgium
Expatriate footballers in France
Yugoslav expatriate sportspeople in France
Expatriate soccer players in Canada
Yugoslav expatriate sportspeople in Canada
Yugoslav football managers
FK Vrbas managers
Serbia and Montenegro football managers
Red Star Belgrade managers
FK Sutjeska Nikšić managers
Red Star Belgrade non-playing staff